Petruccio de Migliolo (died 1486) was a Roman Catholic prelate who served as Bishop of Lacedonia (1463–1481) and Bishop of Bisaccia (1450–1463).

Biography
On 12 June 1450, Petruccio de Migliolo was appointed during the papacy of Pope Nicholas V as Bishop of Bisaccia.
On 30 January 1463, he was appointed during the papacy of Pope Pius II as Bishop of Lacedonia.
He served as Bishop of Lacedonia until his death in 1481.

References

External links and additional sources
 (for Chronology of Bishops) 
 (for Chronology of Bishops) 

15th-century Italian Roman Catholic bishops
Bishops appointed by Pope Nicholas V
Bishops appointed by Pope Pius II
1486 deaths